Jessica Kelly Siobhán Reilly (born 18 July 1977) is an English actress. She first appeared on screen in 1995 on the series The Biz. Her other television work includes starring roles in the British crime drama Above Suspicion (2009–2012), the American psychological medical drama Black Box (2014), the American anthology crime drama True Detective (2015) and the historical fantasy drama Britannia (2018). Since 2018, she has played Beth Dutton on the neo-Western drama series Yellowstone, opposite Kevin Costner.

Reilly's film work began in 2000 in the English comedy film Maybe Baby. She went on to have a supporting role in the romantic drama Pride & Prejudice (2005), a leading role in the horror thriller film Eden Lake (2008), the role of Mary Morstan in Sherlock Holmes (2009) and its 2011 sequel Sherlock Holmes: A Game of Shadows, a leading role in Flight with Denzel Washington (2012), and the thriller 10x10 with Luke Evans (2018).

She was nominated for a Laurence Olivier Award for her performance in After Miss Julie at the Donmar Warehouse (2003–2004).

Early life
Reilly was born and brought up in Chessington, the daughter of a hospital receptionist mother and Jack Reilly, a police officer. She attended Tolworth Girls' School in Tolworth, where she studied drama to obtain a GCSE. Her grandparents are Irish.

Career
Reilly wrote to the producers of the television drama Prime Suspect, starring Helen Mirren, to ask for work. Six months later she auditioned for a role in "Prime Suspect 4: Inner Circle", which was broadcast on ITV on 7 May 1995. The following year, she appeared in an episode of the Carlton UK television period drama series Bramwell playing a disturbed young woman. Six years later, she appeared alongside Mirren in the film Last Orders.

Her first professional role was followed by a series of parts on the English stage. She worked with Terry Johnson in four productions: Elton John’s Glasses (1997), The London Cuckolds (1998), The Graduate (2000) and Piano/Forte (2006). Johnson wrote Piano/Forte for her and said, "Kelly is possibly the most natural, dyed-in-the-wool, deep-in-the-bone actress I've ever worked with." Reilly has stated that she learned the most as an actor from Karel Reisz, who directed her in The Yalta Game in Dublin in 2001. She said, "He was my masterclass. There is no way I would have been able to do Miss Julie if I hadn't done that play."

By 2000, Reilly felt she was being typecast in comedy roles, and actively sought out a role as the young Amy in Last Orders, directed by Fred Schepisi. This was followed by a role in the Royal Court's 2001 rerun of Sarah Kane's Blasted. The Times called her "theatrical Viagra". In 2002, Reilly starred alongside Audrey Tautou and Romain Duris as Wendy, an English Erasmus student, in the French comedy L'Auberge espagnole (The Spanish Apartment). She reprised her role in the 2005 sequel, Les Poupées russes (Russian Dolls) and the 2013 follow-up, Casse-tête chinois (Chinese Puzzle). Also in 2005, Reilly had roles in such films as Mrs Henderson Presents and Pride & Prejudice.

Reilly's first lead role came in 2008 in the horror film Eden Lake and, in 2009, she had a high-profile role on prime-time British television in Above Suspicion. Reilly also appeared in three major films: Sherlock Holmes, Triage, and Me and Orson Welles.

In 2011, Reilly reprised her role as Mary Watson in Sherlock Holmes: A Game of Shadows. In 2012, Reilly appeared opposite Sam Rockwell in A Single Shot and had a leading role in Robert Zemeckis' Flight opposite Denzel Washington. In 2014, Reilly starred with Greg Kinnear in the film Heaven is for Real and in the John Michael McDonagh film Calvary. The same year, Reilly starred in the short-lived ABC series, Black Box, as Catherine Black, a famed neuroscientist who explores and solves the mysteries of the brain (the black box) while hiding her own bipolar disorder from the world.

In 2015, Reilly starred in the second season of the television series True Detective as Jordan Semyon, the wife of Vince Vaughn's character, Frank Semyon. The same year, Reilly made her Broadway debut opposite Clive Owen and Eve Best in Harold Pinter's play Old Times at the American Airlines Theatre.

In 2016, she had a supporting role in Bastille Day. In 2017, Reilly played the Celtic Queen Kerra, confronting the Roman invasion of Britain in Sky TV's Britannia.

She was cast in the leading female role in the Western-style U.S. series Yellowstone, a Paramount Network drama that debuted on 20 June 2018. Reilly plays Beth Dutton, the daughter of John Dutton, played by Kevin Costner. Reilly's and Costner's characters are constantly at war with several outside parties who want to gain control of the Duttons' family land.

Awards and nominations
Reilly's performance in After Miss Julie at the Donmar Warehouse made her a star of the London stage and earned her a nomination for a Laurence Olivier Theatre Award for Best Actress of 2003. Aged 26, she was the youngest person ever nominated for that award. In 2005, she won Best Newcomer Award at the Cannes Film Festival for her role as Wendy in Russian Dolls (Les Poupées Russes). In 2006, Reilly won the Empire Award for Best Newcomer for her role in the British comedy film, Mrs Henderson Presents. She was nominated once again for an Olivier Award for her performance as Desdemona in the acclaimed production of Othello at the Donmar Warehouse in 2009. Reilly was nominated for Best Actress at the British Independent Film Awards for Eden Lake in 2010. She won the Spotlight Award at the 2012 Hollywood Film Festival for her performance as Nicole in Flight.

Personal life
Reilly was engaged to actor Jonah Lotan from 2007 to 2009. In 2010, Kelly met Kyle Baugher, a financier, in Marfa, Texas. They married in Somerset, England in 2012.

Filmography

Film

Television

Awards and nominations

References

External links

20th-century English actresses
21st-century English actresses
Actresses from London
English film actresses
English people of Irish descent
English radio actresses
English Shakespearean actresses
English stage actresses
English television actresses
Living people
People educated at Tolworth Girls' School
1977 births
Chopard Trophy for Female Revelation winners